Josef "Pepi" Stiegler (born 20 April 1937 in Lienz, Austria) is a former alpine ski racer and Olympic gold medalist. He was a member of the Austrian national ski team during the late 1950s and early 1960s and was one of the world's premier racers. His two children are on the U.S. Ski Team: daughter Resi (b. 1985) is on the World Cup team and son Seppi (b. 1988) is on the Nor-Am circuit.

At the 1960 Winter Olympics of Squaw Valley, Stiegler won a silver medal in the giant slalom and took fifth place in the slalom. At the 1964 Winter Olympics of Innsbruck, he took the bronze medal in giant slalom at Axamer Lizum and then won the gold in slalom, edging out American medalists Billy Kidd and Jimmie Heuga. - He became "Austrian sportsman of the Year 1964".

Pepi Stiegler later made appearances at many ski events in the United States and wrote articles for ski magazines.  In 1965, he became the first ski school director at Jackson Hole, Wyoming, where he served for 29 years, followed by eight years as ambassador of skiing. He stepped down in 2002 after 37 years with the resort.

Similar to Heuga, Stiegler was diagnosed with multiple sclerosis in 1993. Austrian teammate Egon Zimmermann, gold medalist in the 1964 Olympic downhill, also has MS.

At age 66, Stiegler earned a bachelor's degree in English literature from Montana State University in Bozeman in May 2003.

Olympic results  

From 1948 through 1980, the Winter Olympics were also the World Championships for alpine skiing.

Video
You Tube – Stiegler: The Style of A Champion (1974 film)

References

External links
 
 
 Ski-db.com – results – 1964 Olympics 
 
 U.S. Ski and Snowboard Hall of Fame – Josef Stiegler
 Intermountain Ski Hall of Fame – Pepi Stielger
 pepistieglers.com – Pepi Stiegler 

Olympic medalists in alpine skiing
Olympic gold medalists for Austria
Olympic silver medalists for Austria
Olympic bronze medalists for Austria
Alpine skiers at the 1960 Winter Olympics
Alpine skiers at the 1964 Winter Olympics
Olympic alpine skiers of Austria
Austrian male alpine skiers
Montana State University alumni
People from Lienz
Austrian emigrants to the United States
People with multiple sclerosis
1937 births
Living people
Medalists at the 1960 Winter Olympics
Medalists at the 1964 Winter Olympics
Sportspeople from Tyrol (state)